Edward Arthur Grouby Jr. (November 22, 1927 – January 2, 2020) was an American politician from the state of Alabama.

Personal life
Edward Jr was born on November 22, 1927. He was the son of judge and state representative Edward Arthur Grouby Sr. and Rose Saunders Grouby. He graduated from Troy State University, and attended the University of Alabama for graduate school. He was a lieutenant commander in the U.S. Navy, and after retiring from the Navy he joined the family business, Grouby Furniture Company. Edward Jr died on January 2, 2020. He was 92 years old.

Political career
He served in the Alabama House of Representatives from 1978 to 1990, losing renomination in 1990.

Electoral history

1990 Alabama 71st District State Representative Democratic Primary Runoff

1990 Alabama 71st District State Representative Democratic Primary

1990 Alabama 71st District State Representative Democratic Primary Runoff (result thrown out)

1990 Alabama 71st District State Representative Democratic Primary (result thrown out)

1986 Alabama 71st District State Representative General Election

1986 Alabama 71st District State Representative Democratic Primary

1983 Alabama 71st District State Representative General Election

1982 Alabama 82nd District State Representative General Election

1982 Alabama 82nd District State Representative Democratic Primary

1978 Alabama 82nd District State Representative General Election

1978 Alabama 82nd District State Representative Democratic Primary

References

1927 births
2020 deaths
Members of the Alabama House of Representatives
Troy University alumni
University of Alabama alumni